Bellevue Cemetery is a historic cemetery in Danville, Kentucky. It was established in the 1840s and was originally named Danville City Cemetery.

The Danville National Cemetery is located within Bellevue Cemetery. The federal government purchased 18 lots within Bellevue Cemetery at the beginning of the American Civil War. The initial burials were Union soldiers who died at several Danville hospitals and subsequent burials included reinterments from other cemeteries. In 1876, the half-acre, rectangular plot in the northwest corner of Bellevue Cemetery was designated a national cemetery.

A lot in Bellevue Cemetery adjacent to the national cemetery contains the burial of 66 Confederate soldiers.

Bellevue Cemetery is managed by the City of Danville and is open to new burials.

Notable burials
William Clayton Anderson (1826–1861), U.S. congressman
Ormond Beatty (1815–1890), seventh president of Centre College
Joshua Fry Bell (1811–1870), U.S. congressman
Jeremiah Boyle (1818–1871), Union Army Brigadier General
John Boyle (1774–1834), U.S. congressman
Milton J. Durham (1824–1911), U.S. congressman
Speed S. Fry (1817–1892), Union Army Brigadier General
William Anderson Hoskins (1826–1897), Colonel 12th Kentucky Infantry
John Kincaid (1791–1873), U.S. congressman
Sara W. Mahan (1870–1966), secretary of state of Kentucky
William Owsley (1782–1862), 16th governor of Kentucky
Thomas A. Spragens (1917–2006), 17th president of Centre College
Albert G. Talbott (1808–1887), U.S. congressman
Margaret Anderson Watts (1832–1905), social reformer
John C. Young (1803–1857), fourth president of Centre College
William C. Young (1842–1896), eighth president of Centre College

References

External links
 A Grave Interest blog: Cemeteries Worth the Visit – Bellevue Cemetery, Danville, Kentucky
 

1849 establishments in Kentucky
Buildings and structures in Danville, Kentucky
Cemeteries in Kentucky
Danville, Kentucky